Hitesh Ceon (born 17 April 1974) is an Icelandic songwriter, producer and composer. He was a part of the production duo Element before it was disbanded in 2016. Hitesh has produced and written songs for artists like Madcon, CeeLo Green, Musiq Soulchild, Alexandra Burke, Snoop Dogg, Daley, Rick Ross, and reproduced two tracks with Michael Jackson for Motown Records.

Hitesh produced and co-wrote the song "Until the Pain Is Gone" with Daley featuring Jill Scott. It was released 24 March 2017 and reached 6th place on the Billboard R&B chart.

As a composer, Hitesh has worked on three albums with cinematic trailer music company Two Steps from Hell, called "Open Conspiracy"(2014), "Mind Tracer"(2020), "Insurgent"(2021) as well as a hybrid orchestral album called "Devotion"(2018) released with trailer music label Moon & Sun.

Hitesh produced the song "Beautiful" with Taylor Dayne, and wrote the song together with Taylor. The song was released in 2007 and became a nr.1 on the Billboard Club Chart.

Hitesh produced and co-wrote the song "It's Ok" with Cee Lo Green, which was the second single form the album "Lady Killer". The album received a grammy nomination.

Grammy Awards

|-
| style="text-align:center;" rowspan="4"| 2010 
|-
| style="text-align:left;"| CeeLo Green The Lady Killer || Best Pop Vocal Album || 
|-
|}

References

External links 
ELEMENT website

1974 births
Living people
Icelandic musicians
Icelandic composers
Icelandic songwriters